Vanessa Joy Lachey (née Minnillo; born November 9, 1980) is an American actress, beauty pageant titleholder, fashion model, and television host. She was named Miss Teen USA in 1998. She has been a New York–based correspondent for Entertainment Tonight and hosted Total Request Live on MTV. She has starred in two network sitcoms and hosted various competition and reality shows. Lachey has the lead role in the CBS spinoff NCIS: Hawaiʻi.

Early life
Vanessa Joy Minnillo was born at the 13th Air Force Regional Medical Center at Clark Air Base in Angeles City, Philippines. Her father, Vincent Charles Minnillo, is an American citizen from Cleveland, Ohio, of Italian and Irish descent, while her mother, Helen Ramos Bercero, is from Manila, Philippines. Minnillo has an adopted brother who is two years older. Her father moved the family frequently because of his service in the Air Force. She lived in Washington, California, Nevada, Florida, Germany and Japan and attended eight schools in nine years. Minnillo's parents separated in 1983 and divorced in 1986. Her mother left the family when Vanessa was nine years old.

Minnillo's parents both remarried. She and her brother Vincent Jr. relocated to Turkey with their mother and stepfather. By 1991, in the wake of Operation Desert Shield, they returned to their father's home, eventually settling in Charleston, South Carolina, where Minnillo attended the Roman Catholic Bishop England High School and was a cheerleader. From then on, she lived with her father and stepmother, Donna. She has said she had "a very rocky, tumultuous childhood." She also attended Our Lady of the Assumption Catholic School in San Bernardino, California, for one year.

Career

1998–2020: Beauty pageants and television hosting 
Lachey was crowned Miss South Carolina Teen USA and won the title Miss Teen USA in 1998. She was the first Miss Teen USA from South Carolina and also the first from South Carolina to be named the pageant's Miss Congeniality. She was a host on MTV's The Morning After (2003) and Total Request Live (2003–2007) and became a New York City correspondent for Entertainment Tonight in 2005. She hosted Miss Teen USA 2004 and Miss Universe 2007 beauty pageants.

After leaving MTV and Entertainment Tonight, Lachey was featured in print and web-based advertising for Bongo Jeans' Spring/Summer 2007 collection. She launched a makeup line with Flirt! Cosmetics, which debuted in August 2007 at Kohl's department stores. In May 2006, Maxim magazine ranked Lachey #15 in its annual Hot 100 issue. She has been featured on the covers of numerous magazines such as Maxim, Vegas, Shape, Parents, People, and Lucky.

Lachey was a finalist in E!'s competition to replace Brooke Burke as host of Wild On!. From 2009 to 2011, she hosted ABC's TV series True Beauty. The series followed 10 contestants who competed for $100,000 and to be featured in People magazine's 100 most beautiful people issue. The series was produced by Tyra Banks and Ashton Kutcher. Lachey became a co-host of ABC's game show Wipeout in December 2011.

Early in her career, Lachey had small roles in numerous television shows, including That's Life, City Girls, 30 Rock, The Bold and the Beautiful, Psych, Hawaii Five-O and Maybe It's Me. In 2008, she portrayed Ashlee in the CBS sitcom How I Met Your Mother, in the episode "No Tomorrow". She portrayed Amy in the parody film Disaster Movie (2008) alongside Matt Lanter, Kim Kardashian and Carmen Electra. The film was panned by critics, but was a moderate box-office success, grossing nearly $35 million against a $20 million budget. In 2009, Lachey and Kardashian shared scenes again, on CBS's police procedural television series CSI: NY.

In 2011, Lachey had a guest role as Carmen Chao in NBC's sitcom 30 Rock. She played Tracy in NBC's sitcom Truth Be Told (2015), about two diverse couples who are best friends and neighbors. The series ended after one season on December 25, 2015. On September 6, 2017, Lachey was announced as one of the celebrities who would take part in the 25th season of Dancing with the Stars, competing against her husband, Nick. She was paired with professional dancer Maksim Chmerkovskiy.  Chmerkovskiy's wife, Peta Murgatroyd, was paired with Nick. On October 30, Lachey and Chmerkovskiy became the seventh couple eliminated from the competition, finishing in joint seventh place.

In 2020, Lachey and her husband Nick were announced as the hosts of the Netflix series Love Is Blind.  Lachey has stated that when producers approached the couple, “they made literally our dreams come true in terms of being able to work together, being able to spend time together, making our marriage stronger ultimately in the end.”  The couple has hosted every season of the show announced to date.

2021–present: NCIS: Hawaii and book 
On April 30, 2021, it was announced that Lachey was the first to be cast as a series regular in CBS's police procedural TV series NCIS: Hawaii. Lachey joined the cast in her first leading series role as Jane Tennant, the first female Special Agent in charge of the NCIS: Pearl. It is a spin-off of the long-running series NCIS, and the fourth series in the NCIS franchise. Filming for the series began on the North Shore of Oahu on June 16, 2021. The series debuted on September 20, 2021.

On July 14, 2021, Lachey announced that her first book, Life from Scratch: Family Traditions That Start with You, would be released on November 16, 2021, by HarperCollins. The cookbook was written by Lachey and Dina Gachman and includes cooking recipes, parenting tips, birthday and date night ideas and personal stories. Lachey also shared in the book how not having a relationship with her mother has affected her approach to certain things, as she used her imagination to create celebrations and milestone markers that became annual rituals for her family. "Instead of constantly saying, 'I don't have a mom to show me how to do my makeup, what not to wear, how to be a good wife or a good mom,' I said, 'You know what? I can start that for my daughter and be that positive influence," she said in an interview with People magazine in July 2021.

In 2023, she appeared in General Motors' and Netflix's Super Bowl commercial to promote electric vehicles.

Personal life

In 2006, she began dating singer Nick Lachey after appearing in the video for his song "What's Left of Me". The couple became engaged in November 2010, and married on July 15, 2011, at Sir Richard Branson's private Necker Island in the British Virgin Islands. They were both born on November 9, exactly seven years apart. They have three children.

Filmography

As an actress

As a television personality or host

Awards and nominations

Published works 

 Lachey, Vanessa: Life from Scratch: Family Traditions That Start with You, HarperCollins, 2021.

See also
Filipinos in the New York metropolitan area

References

External links

Vanessa Lachey Net Worth
 

Nick Lachey
1980 births
Actresses from Charleston, South Carolina
American actresses of Filipino descent
American beauty pageant winners
American female models
American film actresses
American infotainers
American models of Filipino descent
American people of Irish descent
American people of Italian descent
American people of Kapampangan descent
American television hosts
American expatriates in Germany
American expatriates in Japan
Living people
1998 beauty pageant contestants
20th-century Miss Teen USA delegates
Miss Teen USA winners
People from Angeles City
VJs (media personalities)
American women television presenters